Hermenegildo Cruz (1880–1943) was a Filipino writer and trade union organizer. He was a founding member of various trade union organizations in the Philippines, notably of Unión Obrera Democrática Filipina, and a member of the Philippine Assembly. He became director of the Bureau of Labor in 1924.

A notable work of his is Kun Sino ang Kumathâ ng̃ "Florante" [sic] (English: " On Who Authored 'Florante' "), published in 1906, which is cited as "the first attempt to explain Balagtas by dealing with the poet's biography and the historical context of the poem". Another work, Kartilyang Makabayan: Mga Tanong at Sagot Ukol Kay Andrés Bonifacio at sa KKK, is a biography of Andrés Bonifacio, the father of the Philippine Revolution and the secret society he founded, the Katipunan.

See also
Florante at Laura
Francisco Balagtas

References

1880 births
1943 deaths
Filipino socialists
Filipino writers
Filipino trade unionists
People from Binondo
Labor in the Philippines
Members of the Philippine Independent Church